Rivers of Nihil is an American technical death metal band from Reading, Pennsylvania. They are currently signed to Metal Blade Records. To date the band has released two EPs and four studio albums. Their most recent release is 2021's The Work. Their 2018 album Where Owls Know My Name  debuted at number 61 on the Billboard 200, selling 2,750 copies in its first week.

History
Rivers of Nihil was formed in 2009. They recorded their first EP Hierarchy later that year with Century vocalist Carson Slovak, who produced numerous works by other bands such as August Burns Red, Texas in July, and Black Crown Initiate (Slovak would later work with the bands on their second and third studio albums, adding writing credits to "Terrestria III: Wither" on Where Owls Know My Name). During this period the band opened shows for bands such as Decapitated, Decrepit Birth, Suffocation, Dying Fetus, and Misery Index.

In 2011, the band worked with producer Len Carmichael to record their second EP Temporality Unbound. The album would spawn a music video for the song “(sin)Chronos".

In February 2012, MetalSucks referred to Rivers of Nihil as the "best new Death metal band you'll hear this year".

On December 10, 2012, Metal Blade Records announced that they had signed Rivers of Nihil to a record deal, and released a demo for the song "Rain Eater". The label also announced that the band would be working with Erik Rutan of Hate Eternal and Morbid Angel to record their first studio album at Mana Recording Studios in Tampa, Florida. The band released the album in the United States on October 15, 2013. The album artwork was created by Dan Seagrave, who would handle the artwork on the band's next two albums as well.

Rivers of Nihil returned to Atrium studios to work again with Slovak on their second full-length studio album, Monarchy, which was released on August 21, 2015. The album sold 1,175 copies in its first week. On August 17, 2015, the band made Monarchy available for streaming in full.

On September 7, 2017, the band announced via their Facebook account that they had returned to the studio, once again working at Atrium Audio, and working again with audio engineers Carson Slovak and Grant McFarland. The band recruited The Kennedy Veil's live drummer Jared Klein to track drums. On March 16, 2018, the band released Where Owls Know My Name as well as a music video for the song "A Home". Metal Injection gave the album a perfect 10/10 score.

On September 24, 2021, the band released their fourth album, titled The Work. It was elected by Loudwire as the 22nd best rock/metal album of 2021. Topore left the band in April 2022. On October 20, 2022, the band announced that they had parted ways with lead singer Jake Dieffenbach.

Members

Current members
Brody Uttley – lead guitar (2009–present), keyboards, programming (2017–present)
Adam Biggs – bass (2009–present), lead vocals (2022–present), backing/additional vocals (2009–2022)
Jared Klein – drums, backing and additional lead (live) vocals (2017–present)
Andy Thomas – rhythm guitar, backing vocals (2023–present, touring 2022)

Current live members
Patrick Corona – Saxophone (2019–present)

Former members
Jake Dieffenbach – lead vocals (2009–2022)
Jon Kunz – rhythm guitar (2009–2014)
Ron Nelson – drums (2009–2014)
Alan Balamut – drums (2014–2016)
Jon Topore – rhythm guitar (2014–2022)
Dylan Potts – drums (2015–2017)

Timeline

Discography

Studio albums

References

2009 establishments in Pennsylvania
American progressive metal musical groups
American technical death metal musical groups
American death metal musical groups
Heavy metal musical groups from Pennsylvania
Metal Blade Records artists
Musical quartets